Awaz (Urdu: ﺁﻭﺍﺯ) (English: The Voice) is a 1978 Pakistani Urdu language film, produced and directed by Zafar Shabab. The film stars Waheed Murad, Shabnam, Ghulam Mohiuddin, Naghma, Nanha and Mohammad Ali. The film was released on 27 October 1978 in Pakistani cinemas.

Cast
Waheed Murad
Shabnam
Ghulam Mohiuddin
Naghma
Nanna
Muhammad Ali

Soundtrack
Music was composed by A. Hameed and the songs were written by Saeed Gillani. Playback singers are Mehdi Hassan, Ghulam Abbas, A Nayyar, Naheed Akhtar and Asad Amanat Ali Khan.

Songs
"Tu mere pyar ka geet hai..." by Mehdi Hassan
"Tu mere pyar ka geet hai..." by Naheed Akhtar
"Tu mere pyar ka geet hai..." by Asad Amanat Ali Khan
"Suno suno, shehar ke basio..." by A Nayyar
"Hari bhari abadian..." by Ghulam Abbas

References

External links

1970s Urdu-language films
Pakistani romantic drama films
1978 films
Films scored by A. Hameed
Urdu-language Pakistani films